The 2008 Challenge Cup (also known as the Carnegie Challenge Cup for sponsorship reasons) was the 107th staging of the most prestigious knock-out competition in the world of Rugby league, featuring teams from across Europe, including England, Scotland, Wales, France and Russia. It began in February 2008.

Teams from the National League were given byes to round three, and teams from the Super League entered in round four. Teams from outside the UK were introduced at various stages.

St. Helens successfully defended their title after beating Hull F.C. 28 - 16 in the final.

Round 1
(week ending 3 February, 3 fixtures played Saturday 9 February (indicated with *), 1 on Saturday 16 February (indicated with **))

*** - Match abandoned after Hunslet Old Boys had 4 players sent off. Hunslet Old Boys were subsequently thrown out of the competition.

Round 2

(weekend of 23 – 24 February)

Russian team Vereya joined in this round. Vereya were runners-up in the Russian Championship to Lokomotiv Moscow. Lokomotiv Moscow joined in the third round.

Round 3

(weekend of 8 – 9 March)

The National Leagues teams, together with Lokomotiv Moscow, Pia, Lezignan and Toulouse joined in this round. Super League teams joined in Round 4.

Round 4

(Weekend of 18 – 20 April)

Super League teams joined in Round 4. From Round 4 onwards, the competition was a straightforward knock-out, with no more teams joining.

All fixtures taken from BBC Sport

Round 5

(weekend of 9 – 12 May)

Quarter finals

Semi finals

Final

UK Broadcasting rights
Selected matches were televised solely by the BBC.

1 Except East and Yorkshire.

2 Except East, Northern Ireland and Yorkshire.

3 Except Yorkshire.

References

External links
Rugby Football League

Challenge Cup
Challenge Cup
Challenge Cup
Challenge Cup
Challenge Cup
Challenge Cup
Challenge Cup